Audiolith Records is a German Independent record label from Bahrenfeld, Hamburg, which publishes mainly Electronic music and Indie rock. While the bands under the label have varied musical styles, the label's main focus is on Electropunk, where it has developed significant influence on the German music scene.

History 

Audiolith Records was founded in 2003 by Lars Lewerenz, who had worked for Dim Mak Records before and had been an active member of the band Dos Stilettos. The label's first publication was the 7" Single Both Sides Of The Ocean by The Dance Inc.. Later on, the label started to publish the bands Der Tante Renate, Egotronic, Plemo, and Saalschutz. The artists of Audiolith Records are mainly from Germany (especially from Hamburg) but there is also one band from California (Innaway).

Artists

References

External links 

Official Website

Companies based in Hamburg
Electronic dance music record labels
German independent record labels
Culture in Hamburg
Electronic music record labels
Indie rock record labels
Record labels established in 2003